Jasmin Halili (born 1 March 1999) is a Serbian high jumper.

His personal best is 2.20 m (Gävle 2019). He won the high jump at 2019 European Team Championships in Skopje.

References

External links
IAAF Athlete’s profile

Serbian male high jumpers
Living people
1999 births
Place of birth missing (living people)